Andrey Vadimovich Nikitin (born 26 October 2000) is a Russian football player who plays as a left winger for FC Ufa on loan from FC Lokomotiv Moscow.

Club career
He made his debut in the Russian Football National League for FC Fakel Voronezh on 1 August 2020 in a game against FC Akron Tolyatti, as a starter.

On 11 February 2021, FC Lokomotiv Moscow purchased his rights and loaned him back to Fakel until the end of the 2020–21 season. On 6 September 2021, he returned to Fakel on a new loan for the 2021–22 season.

On 19 August 2022, Nikitin joined FC Ufa on loan with an option to buy.

References

External links
 
 Profile by Russian Football National League
 

2000 births
Sportspeople from Belgorod Oblast
People from Belgorod
Living people
Russian footballers
Association football forwards
FC Salyut Belgorod players
FC Fakel Voronezh players
FC Lokomotiv Moscow players
FC Ufa players
Russian First League players
Russian Second League players